The iMac G3, originally released as the iMac, is a series of Macintosh personal computers sold by Apple Computer from 1998 to 2003. The iMac was the first major new product release for Apple under Steve Jobs, Apple's CEO and cofounder, who returned to the financially troubled company in 1996 after eleven years away. Jobs reorganized the company and simplified the product line; the iMac was designed as Apple's new consumer desktop product, a cheaper computer for average consumers that would easily connect to the internet.

The iMac's all-in-one design is based around a cathode ray tube display, with the computer's G3 processor, components, and connectivity included in the same enclosure. Head of design Jony Ive and his team developed a teardrop-shaped, translucent plastic case for the iMac, a radical departure from the look of previous personal computers. They developed new work methodologies to finish the computer in an accelerated timeframe, and created new workflows they would use for designing products going forward. The iMac eschewed legacy technologies like serial ports and floppy disk drives for CD-ROMs and USB ports.

Critical response to the iMac was mixed; journalists thought the machine would be good for new users, but bemoaned the lack of legacy technology, or felt the mouse and keyboard were uncomfortable. The iMac was an immediate commercial success, becoming Apple's fastest-selling computer and selling more than 5 million units in its lifetime. The original model was revised several times, increasing the processor speed, memory, hard drive space, and other capabilities. The iMac is credited with saving Apple from financial ruin, and for turning computers from niche, technical products to mass consumer fashion. The translucent plastic look was appropriated by other computers and consumer products, leading to legal action from Apple. The G3-based model was eventually replaced by a G4-powered successor, while the iMac G3's role in education markets would be replaced by the eMac.

Background 

In the late 1990s, computer maker Apple was in a precarious financial position. At the end of 1997, Apple was selling just 1.8 million Macs per year, down from 4.5 million two years earlier. What sales Apple did make were cannibalized by licensed Mac systems that undercut Apple's own computers on price and performance. Apple pulled out of the low-cost computer market entirely, unable to compete on price and getting products to consumers rapidly.

In December 1996, Apple purchased computer maker NeXT, with NeXT founder Steve Jobs returning to the company he had once cofounded and then been ousted from. Along with Jobs came NeXT's operating system, NeXTSTEP, which would become the foundation for Apple's next-generation operating system Mac OS X. While Jobs returned to Apple only as an "advisor", Apple's board fired CEO Gil Amelio on July 9, 1997, and Jobs replaced him as interim CEO.

Upon his return to Apple, Jobs drastically streamlined the company, returning Apple to profitability by cost-cutting. But the company still needed new hit products. Jobs envisioned winnowing down Apple's confusing and extensive computer offerings to just four products: a laptop and desktop model each for professionals and consumers. What became the iMac would slot into the consumer desktop position. Jobs wanted an inexpensive computer that would prioritize easy internet connectivity. The engineering and design teams had less than a year to deliver a shipping product.

Design 
Apple industrial design director Robert Brunner left Apple in 1996, intending for the 29-year-old Jony Ive to take his place. Ive inherited an award-winning design team within an Apple marred by financial dysfunction. Dispirited with Apple's leadership, Ive was soon also thinking of leaving the company. At the meeting announcing Jobs' new role as CEO, Jobs addressed the assembled staff and insisted Apple's problems were its poor products. Ive was struck by Jobs' focus on making industrial design a core part of Apple's comeback strategy. Ive and Jobs quickly developed a rapport, and Jobs decided to keep Apple's industrial design team under Ive intact amid wider reorganizations and cuts.

Initially, Jobs intended for the new consumer desktop to be a "network computer"—a cheap, low-powered terminal without disk drives that used the internet to connect to remote servers. Ive's team was given Jobs' specifications for the new product in September 1997: it should be a distinctive all-in-one computer with a selling price of around US$1,200, much lower than the $2,000 ($ adjusted for inflation) Apple was charging for their entry-level models. The design team tried to decide who the audience for the computer would be, and what sorts of objects conveyed the emotions they wanted the new product to instill. They developed sketches collaboratively, with designer Doug Satzger coming up with an egg-shaped drawing based on his previous work on Thomson Consumer Electronics televisions. Ive and the rest of the team decided to make the egg shape the main design focus, even after Jobs rejected the look. Ive defended the design as playful and fun, and eventually won Jobs over, who took to carrying a foamcore model of the computer around the Apple campus to show it off.

When discussing the idea of a machine that inspired positive emotions, the designers mentioned colorful candy dispensers. Materials tests with solid plastics looked cheap, so they made the case translucent instead. Translucent hardware design was not new to Apple's products; Apple had released the Power Macintosh 8600 and 9600, beige tower computers that had translucent green latches. The LaserWriter 8500, eMate 300, and Studio Display featured more extensive use of translucent colored plastics. Former Apple senior designer Thomas Meyerhoffer described the eMate's use of plastics as a way to make the product more accessible and stand out from the crowd. To Ive, the translucency "came across as cheeky", but it meant the internals would have to be designed for aesthetics as well. Inspiration came from whatever translucent items the designers brought in; one such item was a piece of greenish-blue beach glass. This "Bondi blue" would be the color Jobs selected for the first iMac.

Apple's design team radically overhauled its processes to meet the tight deadline. In the past, they had sent two-dimensional blueprints or hand-drawn sketches to toolmakers to create the molds, a laborious process that could take months. Instead, Apple relied on computer-aided design, using the three-dimensional (3D) modeling program Alias Wavefront to sculpt models, with CNC milling machines and primitive 3D printers used to create physical mockups. Apple's product designers wrote software to allow the Wavefront 3D models to be brought into Unigraphics, a program used in aerospace design. This allowed the engineers to compare 3D models of the computer's components with the casing, speeding up the time it took to figure out a workable combination of external and internal elements.

Jobs began to sour on the network computer concept as similar products struggled in the market, and was convinced to recalibrate the network computer project as a full-featured machine with optical and disk drives. The shipping iMac encased its components and a 15-inch cathode ray tube display within a plastic shell. The machine featured translucency everywhere, from the small foot used to raise the computer, to the power cord (designed to look like condensation on glass after a shower). Port labels and regulatory markings used holographic stickers. The design team added a recessed handle to the back of the computer to make the machine more personal and approachable for new computer users. The cost of the casing was more than three times that of a typical computer, but Ive credited Jobs with intuitively understanding what they were aiming for with the design and not demanding justification for the increased costs. The keyboard and mouse were redesigned for the iMac with matching translucent plastics and trim. Ive was especially proud of the round mouse, which showed the complicated internals partially shrouded behind the Apple logo.

Jobs wanted the new computer to be a shift away from old or proprietary technology to a modern "legacy-free" computer; Apple's engineers adapted work done on the abandoned Common Hardware Reference Platform specification to speed up development of the computer. These included using standard SO-DIMM memory like Windows PCs of the era, and an OpenFirmware read-only memory (ROM). Previous Macintosh computers used complex machine-specific ROMs, while the new computer's instructions were loaded from memory, shortening production time. The iMac also dropped legacy serial ports, Apple Desktop Bus, and floppy disk drive. Instead, it used Universal Serial Bus (USB) ports. USB was faster and cheaper than Apple Desktop Bus and serial ports, but it was very new—the standard would not be finalized until after the iMac's release—and USB was at the time unsupported by any third-party Mac peripheral. Jobs wagered that the unproven connector would solve the problem of accessory makers abandoning the increasingly small Mac market with its special connectors. The iMac did not officially have an expansion slot, but early versions of the machine had a "mezzanine slot". While it was intended only for internal use, a few third-party expansion cards were released for it, such as video card upgrades and SCSI ports. Early models also featured an IrDA infrared port that allowed personal digital assistants and other devices to wirelessly transmit information to the computer. Jobs was furious that the initial iMac model came with a tray-loading CD-ROM instead of a more modern slot-loading drive, and nearly canceled the product launch over it. Despite Jon Rubinstein insisting that Jobs had always known about the CD tray, Jobs ultimately only went ahead with the launch after he was assured they would switch subsequent models to a slot-loading drive as soon as possible.

In early 1998, representatives from the advertising agency TBWA\Chiat\Day were given an introduction to the iMac, at that point code-named "C1". Creative director Ken Segall recalled that the agency's first impression was that the product might be too shocking to be successful. Jobs was proud to show off Apple's work, insisting that "the back of our computer looks better than the front of [our competitors'] computers." The product, however, still did not have a final name. Jobs informed Segall that the internal name was "MacMan" (contributed by Apple marketing executive Phil Schiller) and to see if they could come up with something better, with the following stipulations: it had to contain "Mac", it had to evoke the product's focus on easy internet connectivity, and it should not sound portable or toy-like. TBWA spent a week developing other names. Segall's pick was "iMac"; it was short, it said the product was a Macintosh computer, and the i prefix suggested the internet.  Jobs disliked all of them and gave the agency another week to generate more possibilities. At the next presentation, Segall once again ended with iMac. Jobs reported that he no longer hated the iMac name, but still preferred MacMan. Though Segall thought he had failed, he learned the next day Jobs had workshopped the name to other employees and gotten a positive response. The iMac name stuck.

Release

The iMac was unveiled by Steve Jobs on May 6, 1998. The product launch echoed that of the original Macintosh 128K reveal in 1984. It was staged in the same location, the Flint Center for the Performing Arts at De Anza College. Jobs invited Apple founding members Steve Wozniak, Mike Markkula, and Michael Scott, as well as members of the original Macintosh team. After demonstrating the look of traditional computers, Jobs revealed the iMac from under a tablecloth. The computer displayed "Hello (again)" on its screen, harkening back to the Macintosh's whimsical "Hello" introduction.

Apple began shipping the iMac G3 on August 15, 1998. It was supported by a $100 million advertising campaign that stressed the iMac's ease of use, internet connectivity, and striking contrast from competitors' products. Actor Jeff Goldblum narrated television ads that rhetorically asked if computer companies had been in "thinking jail" for only making beige products. Other promotions included radio giveaways, midnight launch events, and "golden tickets" hidden in select iMacs that could be redeemed for a tour of an Apple factory.

The launch configuration of the iMac shipped with a 233 MHz PowerPC G3 processor, ATI Rage IIc graphics, 4 GB hard drive, tray-loading CD-ROM drive, two USB ports, networking, infrared port, built-in stereo speakers, and headphone ports. It came only in the Bondi blue color and shipped with MacOS 8.1. The iMac was updated with faster ATI Rage Pro Turbo graphics options and MacOS 8.5 on October 17. A more substantial revision to the iMac lineup came in 1999. These models came in five new colors: blueberry, strawberry, tangerine, grape, and lime. Internally, they featured a faster 266 MHz processor and a 6GB hard drive. The IrDA port and mezzanine slot were removed.

On October 5, 1999, Apple released a new series of iMacs. Whereas the original iMac models focused on connecting consumers to the internet, the new iMac line focused on the emerging digital video (DV) market. The new models were similar in appearance to the previous models, but came in a slightly smaller enclosure; the steel casing shrouding many of the components in the previous model was also removed, and the colors were lighter, with clearer plastics. Instead of a tray-loading optical drive, the new models featured slot-loading drives. They also added a rear door so users could easily add additional RAM, and a slot for an AirPort wireless networking card. Apple partnered with Harman Kardon to design the iMac's new internal speakers; Harman Kardon also produced a separate subwoofer, the iSub, powered by USB. The new iMacs had no fan; the components were cooled via convection, with hot air exhausted through vents around the computer's top handle. Three new models were offered, with some colors and features restricted to certain models. The cheapest model, now at US$999, was available only in one color. It shipped with a 350 MHz processor, 64 MB of RAM, a better graphics chipset, and larger hard drive. The iMac DV came in five colors and shipped with the video editing software iMovie. Featuring a 400 MHz processor, it also included two FireWire ports, larger hard drive, and DVD-ROM optical drive. The iMac DV Special Edition came in a new graphite color and shipped with more RAM and the largest-capacity (13 GB) hard drive. The iMac DV models also included a VGA video-out port for mirroring the iMac's display to another monitor.

On July 19, 2000, Apple updated the iMac line to four configurations with five colors. A cheap, base iMac without FireWire or video-out in a new indigo color retailed for a lower US$799 price. It kept the same 350 MHz processor and 64 MB RAM, but bumped the hard drive capacity. The iMac DV and DV+ came with faster 400 or 450 MHz processors and larger hard drives; the DV+ model featured a DVD-ROM drive. At the top end was the iMac DV Special Edition. These models came with a faster processor (500 MHz), 128 MB of memory, larger hard drive, and an exclusive color (snow.)

Apple reduced its configurations with the next refresh on February 22, 2001. The new machines came with CD-RW drives and iTunes software as Apple shifted to digital music consumption. The iMac and iMac Special Edition shipped with 400, 500, or 600 MHz processors, and FireWire became standard across the line alongside a faster graphics chipset and bigger hard drives. In addition to the previous indigo (iMac) and graphite (iMac Special Edition) colors, Apple created two new patterns—"Flower Power" and "Blue Dalmatian", intended to represent the way music would look.

A final revision in July 2001 returned to more sedate colors—indigo, graphite, and snow. These models shipped with Mac OS X, faster processors (at 500, 600, or 700 MHz), and increased memory and storage—up to 256 MB and 60 GB on the Special Edition. Following the introduction of the iMac G4 in January 2002, Apple continued selling some G3-based iMac models, with 500 or 600 MHz models in indigo, snow, and graphite. The indigo and graphite models were later dropped, with the snow model being discontinued in March 2003.

Reception
The iMac G3 received mixed reviews on release. Tech reviewers were often negative about the machine. Macworlds Andrew Gore predicted that the iMac G3 might be as important as the original Macintosh for shifting the computing paradigm, and that Apple's "Think Different" marketing was not just empty talk. Reporters including Newsweeks Barbara Kantrowitz and the San Francisco Chronicles David Einstein considered it the first promising step in Apple's possible resurgence. In comparison, Hiawatha Bray predicted the iMac was doomed and a severe misstep from Jobs.

The look of the computer was generally praised. Many reviewers compared its curved look to the recently-released Volkswagen New Beetle, while journalist Rob Morse likened it to a "huggable" futuristic machines like R2-D2 or a toy from The Jetsons. Less positive takes compared the machine to an AMC Gremlin.

Positive reviews highlighted the computer's ease of use for setup and operation; Morse wrote that machine felt "almost human" and approachable for a non-tech consumer. While publications including CNN and PC Week considered the iMac's performance fast, others felt the machine was underpowered, and PC Worlds testing showed that the machine generally performed poorer than Windows PC competitors. While reviews noted that general consumers and new computer buyers would be well-served by the machine, reviews were less sure that it could fit into an office environment, especially if it was not networked.

Criticism focused on the lack of legacy ports. While Gore considered the loss of the floppy drive acceptable, he wished the CD-ROM module, which was taken from a PowerBook, could be swapped like in that notebook computer. He also felt the lack of expansion slots limited the computer's potential down the road. The Washington Posts John Breeden specifically highlighted the loss of SCSI as making the machine unsuitable for office work. Other reviewers bemoaned the high cost of external replacements for the internal disk drive, low amount of installed memory, and tinny speakers.

Another major complaint with the iMac was its original mouse and keyboard; reviewers found that they were small and hard to use comfortably, calling it an example of style over substance. The shape and ease of use of the mouse was derisively compared to a hockey puck, and its cable frequently considered too short. The pointing device's round shape made it hard for users to discern if it was oriented the right way. The mouse and keyboard would be replaced with the Apple Pro Mouse and Apple Pro Keyboard starting with the 2000 revision iMacs. Other complaints included the lack of software and USB accessories, incompatibility with Windows, and price. Subsequent iMac revisions addressed some of the product's perceived shortcomings. As the product line aged, however, reviews noted that the new models offered fairly little advancements over previous revisions.

The iMac won numerous design competitions and honors, including Gold at the 1999 D&AD Design Awards in the UK, and "Object of the Year" by The Face. Models of the machine are held in the collections of museums including The Henry Ford, Victoria and Albert Museum, Powerhouse Museum, and Museum of Modern Art.

Sales
The iMac was an immediate hit with consumers, selling 278,000 units in its first six weeks of sale, and 800,000 units after 20 weeks. It was the top-selling desktop computer in US stores for its first three months. Nearly half of iMac sales went to new computer buyers, while nearly 20 percent were Windows PC users who had switched to the Mac. The quarter the iMac shipped was the first time since late 1995 that Mac sales had improved year-over-year, and saw the Mac grow its worldwide market share from 3 percent to 5 percent. Apple went from losing $878 million in 1997, to making its first profit in three years in 1998. The iMac continued to be a strong seller for Apple as it returned to profitability. It sold 3.7 million units by July 2000, and shipped its 5 millionth iMac in April 2001.

Legacy 

The iMac G3 became a computing icon; Paul Atkinson wrote that while the original Macintosh had made a huge impact on computing, it had not affected how computers looked, and for decades personal computers were defined by unimaginative beige boxes. The iMac, in contrast, did not affect how consumers used computers, but its design changed the idea of what computers could look like. Apple defined itself in opposition to its competitors, who rushed to produce computers that followed the design language, adding similar translucent or colored plastic to their designs. The iMac mirrored contemporary design trends in using streamlining and curves; one designer suggested that the focus on rounding helped make objects more approachable and personal.

Apple protected the distinctive iMac design with legal action against competing computer makers who attempted to imitate the iMac, such as eMachines' eOne. The iMac made computers something fashionable, as opposed to utilitarian, and helped introduce USB to the masses and speed the demise of the floppy disk. Following Apple's lead, other computer makers focused on "legacy-free" personal computers.

The iMac's massive success helped buoy Apple while it released a modern operating system and refreshed the rest of the Mac lineup, as well as keeping Apple at the forefront of the emerging digital audio and video trends. It also established a formula of quickly polishing a new Apple product through rapid iterative updates. Macworld noted the iMac not only saved Apple financially, but proved Apple could still produce exciting and innovative products. The iMac also served as the public's introduction to Ive, instantly making him one of the most celebrated designers in the world. The product's name would influence a host of Apple's later product launches, from iPods and iLife to the iPhone, and for a time defined Apple's consumer-focused product lines. The consumer laptop Apple released to fill that segment of its product matrix, the iBook, followed the iMac's lead in a lack of legacy technology and colorful translucent plastic. The iMac was so successful in the education market that Apple created a G4-powered successor, the eMac.

The design influence of the iMac G3 was not limited to personal computers; by the early 2000s, multicolored, translucent plastic designs had become a common look among consumer designs ranging from microwaves to George Foreman Grills. USA Today called the translucence trend "electronics voyeurism". Apple would not continue the look, and followed the bulbous candy-colored iMac G3 with the flat-panel, white iMac G4 in 2002. Apple's desktop lineup would remain relatively monochrome in the following years; the 2021 release of Apple silicon-based iMacs sold in seven colors were considered to harken back to the iMac's colorful roots.

Specifications

First generation

Second generation

Notes

References

External links 

G3
PowerPC Macintosh computers
Macintosh all-in-ones
Computer-related introductions in 1998